Sabrina Zollinger (born 27 March 1993) is a Swiss ice hockey player for HV71.

International career
Zollinger was selected for the Switzerland national women's ice hockey team in the 2010 Winter Olympics. She played in all five games, but did not record a point.

Zollinger has also appeared for Switzerland at four IIHF Women's World Championships. Her first appearance came in 2009. She was a member of the bronze medal winning team at the 2012 championships.

Zollinger made three appearances for the Switzerland women's national under-18 ice hockey team, at two levels of the IIHF World Women's U18 Championships. Her first came in 2009.

Career statistics

References

External links

1993 births
Living people
Ice hockey players at the 2010 Winter Olympics
Ice hockey players at the 2018 Winter Olympics
Olympic ice hockey players of Switzerland
Ice hockey people from Zürich
Swiss women's ice hockey defencemen
Swiss expatriate ice hockey people
Swiss expatriate sportspeople in Sweden